Robert Elliott Speer (10 September 1867 – 23 November 1947) was an American Presbyterian religious leader and an authority on missions.

Biography
He was born at Huntingdon, Pennsylvania on 10 September 1867. He graduated from Phillips Academy in 1886 and from Princeton in 1889, and studied at Princeton Theological Seminary in 1890–91.

He became active as an itinerant recruiter for the Student Volunteer Movement (SVM) from 1889 to 1890.

In 1891, he was appointed secretary of the American Presbyterian Mission.  He visited missions in Persia, India, China, Korea, and Japan in 1896–97, and in South America in 1909 and later made similar tours. In Princeton he was greatly influenced by Arthur Tappan Pierson. Under his leadership, the foreign missions of the Presbyterian church became remarkably successful. Speer retired in 1937.

He married Emma Doll Bailey in 1893 and, together, they had five children, one of whom, Elliot Speer (1898 – 1934), became headmaster of Northfield Mount Hermon School, where he was murdered in his home on campus, on 14 September 1934. Their daughter Margaret Bailey Speer (1900–1997) was dean of Yenching Women's College in China in the 1930s, and headmistress of the Shipley School from 1944 to 1965.

He died on 3 November 1947, in Lower Merion Township, Pennsylvania.

Theology 
Although he published two articles in The Fundamentals, some have called him liberal because he sided with the Presbyterian Church (USA) and opposed John Gresham Machen during the anti-liberal/modernist controversies of the 1930s. Speer affirmed traditional Christian doctrines such as the historical accuracy of the Bible, the Virgin Birth, and the Resurrection of Christ, yet also embraced a social vision of Christianity placed him closer to theological liberals than some conservatives would tolerate. He is quoted to have said that Karl Barth offered "an essential recovery of aspects of truth which will not so easily be lost again."

Influence 
Speer wrote numerous sermons, articles, pamphlets, and books among which are biographies, biblical commentaries and books on Christian living. Most deal with missionary principles and practices but some tackle controversial social problems. He coined the famous four principles of Jesus which became embedded in Moral Rearmament and in Alcoholics Anonymous as the "Four Absolutes" or the "Four Standards". Basing his views on his own biblical research, Speer regarded these four principles as one of Jesus' key teachings: Purity, Honesty, Unselfishness and Love. While the initiator of Moral Rearmament, Dr Frank Buchman, held Robert E. Speer in high regard, he used a version of the four principles which had been reworked by Pr Henry Burt Wright from Yale.

Publications

 The Man Christ Jesus (1896)
 The Deity of Christ 
 A Memorial of a True Life: Biography of H. M. Beaver (1898)
 The Man Paul (1900)
 Presbyterian Foreign Missions (1901)
 Missionary Principles and Practice (1902)
 The Principles of Jesus: applied to some questions of today (1902)
 A Memorial of Horace Tracy Pitkin (1903)
 A Young Man's Questions (1903)
 Missions and Modern History (two volumes, 1904) vol. 1, vol. 2
 The Marks of a Man (1907)
 Christ and Life
 Christianity and the Nations (1910)
 The Light of the World (1911)
 South American Problems (1912)
 Studies of Missionary Leadership (1914)
 John's Gospel (1915)
 The Stuff of Manhood (1917)
 Young Men Who Overcame
 The Christian Man the Church and the War (1918)
 The Gospel and the New World (1919)
 Seeking the Mind of Christ
 A Missionary Pioneer in the Far East (1922)
 Of One Blood (1924)
 Seeking the Mind of Christ (1926)
 The Unity of the Americas (1926)
 Some Living Issues (1930)
 The Finality of Jesus Christ (1933)
 Five Minutes a Day (1943)
 George Bowen of Bombay (1938)
 Men Who Were Found Faithful (1912)
 The Master of the Heart

See also 
 History of religion in the United States
Protestant missions in China
List of Protestant missionaries in China
Christianity in China
Robert Elliott Speer Manuscript Collection at Princeton Theological Seminary

Notes

References 
 
 
 
Attribution
 

People from Huntingdon, Pennsylvania
Princeton University alumni
American Presbyterian missionaries
American religious writers
American theologians
1867 births
1947 deaths
Burials at Brookside Cemetery (Englewood, New Jersey)